Homerun is the fourteenth regular studio album by the European-American pop group The Kelly Family, released by Polydor in 2004 (see 2004 in music) throughout most of Europe. The first disc has only acoustic songs while the songs on the second disc include drums and e-guitarres. In 2004 and 2005 The Kelly Family toured Germany to promote the album.

Track listing

Disc one
"I'll Be There" – 4:16
"Walking" – 3:49
"Strange World" – 3:39
"What If Love" – 4:06
"Don't Always Want" – 3:46
"Intermission: Mother Teresa" – 0:13
"Carry My Soul" – 3:43
"Break The Walls" – 3:52
"Burning Fire" – 5:18
"Don't Be So Unhappy" – 4:31

Disc two
"Babylon" – 4:06
"Everybody Is Beautiful" – 4:07
"Streets of Love" – 3:23
"Street Kid (Gucci Shit)" – 3:27
"Intermission: China Keitetsi" – 0:34
"Blood" – 3:51
"I Wish the Very Best" – 4:35
"Flip a Coin" – 4:30
"Edge of Happiness" – 4:54

Personnel

Musicians
 Wilhelm Geschwind - bass, fretless bass, piccolo-double bass.
 Axel Hilgenstoehler - Wurlitzer electric piano, guitar, sound treatment.
 Angelo Kelly - vocals, drums, percussion, guitars, keyboards, piano, Hammond organ, xylophone.
 Jimmy Kelly - vocals, piano, Wurlitzer electric piano, Hammond organ, guitars, percussion.
 Joey Kelly - vocals, acoustic guitar, electric guitar, percussion.
 Maite Kelly - vocals, acoustic guitar, Wurlitzer electric piano, percussion.
 Paddy Kelly-  vocals, guitars, piano, keyboards, mandolin, Wurlitzer electric piano, Rhodes piano, Hammond organ, percussion.
 Patricia Kelly - vocals, piano, acoustic guitar, percussion.
 Paul Kelly - hurdy-gurdy.
 Peter Materna - saxophone.
 Ölberger Kinderchor - vocals.
 Marc Weis - sound treatment.

Production

 Writing: The Kelly Family
 Recording: Britta Kühlmann 
 Mastering: Bob Ludwig 
 Mixing: Richard Rainey
 Mixing assistance: Flo Beir

 Engineers: Britta Kühlmann 
 Engineering assistance: Marc Weis
 Photography: Thomas Stachelhaus
 Artwork: Heidi Mösl
 Litho: RGI Dortmund Germany

Charts

References

External links
 KellyFamily.de — official site

2004 albums
The Kelly Family albums